Lineidae is a family of nemertean worms. It contains the following genera:

 Aetheolineus Senz, 1993
 Ammolineus Senz, 2001
 Antarctolineus Muller & Scripcariu, 1964
 Apatronemertes Wilfert & Gibson, 1974
 Australineus Gibson, 1990
 Cephalurichus Gibson, 1985
 Colemaniella Gibson, 1982
 Corsoua Corrêa, 1963
 Craticulineus Gibson, 1984
 Diplopleura Stimpson, 1857
 Eousia Gibson, 1990
 Euborlasia Vaillant, 1890
 Flaminga Corrêa, 1957
 Fragilonemertes Riser, 1998
 Gastropion Moretto, 1998
 Heteroenopleus Wern, 1998
 Heterolineus Friedrich, 1935
 Heteronemertes Chernyshev, 1995
 Hinumanemertes Iwata, 1970
 Kirsteueria Gibson, 1978
 Kohnia Sundberg & Gibson, 1995
 Leucocephalonemertes Cantell, 1996 
 Lineopsella Friedrich, 1970
 Lineopselloides Gibson, 1990
 Lineopsis 
 Lineus Sowerby, 1806
 Micconemertes Gibson, 1997
 Micrella 
 Micrellides Gibson, 1985
 Micrura Ehrenberg, 1871
 Micrurimorpha Korotkevich, 1980
 Micrurinella Friedrich, 1960
 Myorhynchonemertes Senz, 1997
 Nemertoscolex Greeff, 1879
 Neolineus 
 Nipponomicrura Chernyshev, 1995
 Notospermus Huschke, 1829
 Paralineopsis Iwata, 1993
 Paralineus Schütz, 1911
 Paramicrura Gibson & Sundberg, 1992
 Paramicrurinella Gibson, 1985
 Parvicirrus Ris, 1993
 Pontolineus 
 Pseudomicrura Strand & Sundberg, 2011
 Pussylineus Corrêa, 1956
 Quasiutolineides Senz, 2001
 Ramphogordius Rathke, 1843
 Rhamphogordius 
 Riseriellus 
 Tarrhomyos Ris, 1993
 Tenuilineus Ris, 1993
 Uricholemma Sundberg & Gibson, 1995
 Utolineides Senz, 1997
 Utolineus Gibson, 1990
 Yininemertes Sun and Lu, 2008
 Zygeupolia Thompson, 1900

References

 
Heteronemertea
Nemertea families